Pen Allt-mawr is a  high subsidiary summit of Waun Fach and the third highest peak in the Black Mountains in south-eastern Wales. A very recognisable and prominent peak of the Black Mountains, it lies near the end of the more westerly of Waun Fach's two broad southern ridges.  Its top Pen Twyn Glas is to the north, while its close neighbour Pen Cerrig-calch is to the south. A prominent spur 1 km to the SSW of the summit is known as Pen Gloch-y-pibwr. The stepped Bryniog ridge curves southward from this point.

Its summit is stony and has damaged Bronze Age cairns and a large shelter cairn together with a trig point. Further Bronze Age cairns are found along the western edge of the plateau to the south.

Geology 
The summit of Pen Allt-mawr is at the northern tip of a broadly triangular summit surface formed from a slab of southerly tilting upper Old Red Sandstone traditionally known as the Quartz Conglomerate. These rocks which date from the Late Devonian Epoch are continuous with those of Pen Cerrig-calch but other than a tiny outlier forming the summit of Sugar Loaf, are found nowhere else within the Black Mountains. Beneath the Quartz Conglomerate are the Early Devonian sandstones of the Brownstones Formation which form the upper slopes and summits of Pen Twyn Glas and Mynydd Llysiau to the north (though are barely seen). More readily eroded mudstone bands within this formation give rise to the stepped appearance of this hill and many of its neighbours. Sandstones of the Senni Formation (traditionally the 'Senni Beds') form the lower slopes of the mountain.

References

External links
 www.geograph.co.uk : photos of Waun Fach and surrounding area

Hewitts of Wales
Nuttalls
Mountains and hills of Powys
Black Mountains, Wales